The Essex County Football Association, also simply known as the Essex FA, is the governing body of football in the county of Essex.

References

External links
 Essex FA's official site

County football associations
Football in Essex
Sports organizations established in 1882